Valeriya Alexandrovna Solovyeva (born 3 November 1992) is Russian former professional tennis player.

Solovyeva has won two doubles titles on the WTA Tour, as well as three singles and 15 doubles titles on the ITF Women's Circuit. On 27 May 2013, she reached her best singles ranking of world No. 163. On 15 July 2013, she peaked at No. 67 in the doubles rankings.

Playing for Russia in Fed Cup competition, Solovyeva has a win–loss record of 1–1. She made her debut in February 2014, partnering Irina Khromacheva in doubles, losing the dead rubber in straight sets to Ashleigh Barty and Casey Dellacqua.

WTA career finals

Doubles: 5 (2 titles, 3 runner-ups)

ITF finals

Singles: 6 (3–3)

Doubles: 23 (15–8)

Fed Cup participation

Doubles

Junior Grand Slam finals

Doubles

References

External links

 
 
 

1992 births
Living people
Sportspeople from Saratov
Russian female tennis players
US Open (tennis) junior champions
Grand Slam (tennis) champions in girls' doubles